Tre-Ysgawen is a hamlet in the  community of Llanddyfnan, Ynys Môn, Wales, which is 135 miles (217.3 km) from Cardiff and 216.2 miles (347.9 km) from London.

The name comes from the Welsh language: "Tre" meaning "homestead" and "ysgawen": "the elder tree".

References

See also
List of localities in Wales by population

Villages in Anglesey